Okibacterium is a Gram-positive and non-spore-forming genus of bacteria from the family of Microbacteriaceae.

References

Further reading 
 

Microbacteriaceae
Bacteria genera